Guézon may refer to:

Guézon, Duékoué, in Duékoué Department, Guémon region, Montagnes District, Ivory Coast
Guézon, Facobly, in Facobly Department, Guémon region, Montagnes District, Ivory Coast
Guézon-Tahouaké, in Bangolo Department, Guémon region, Montagnes District, Ivory Coast